The Armagh-Kerry rivalry is a Gaelic football rivalry between Irish county teams Kerry and Armagh, who first played each other in 1953. It is a rivalry which reached its height during the first decade of the 21st century. Armagh's home ground is the Athletic Grounds and Kerry's home ground is Fitzgerald Stadium, however, all of their championship meetings have been held at neutral venues, usually Croke Park.

While Kerry have the highest number of Munster titles and Armagh are fifth on the roll of honour in Ulster, they have also enjoyed success in the All-Ireland Senior Football Championship, having won 38 championship titles between them to date.

All-time results

Legend

Senior

References

Kerry
Kerry county football team rivalries